Maliattha is a genus of moths of the family Noctuidae first described by Francis Walker in 1863.

Description
Palpi upturned, reaching above vertex of head, where the second joint clothed with long hair below, and third joint prominent. Antennae minutely ciliated in male. Thorax roughly scaled but tuftless. Abdomen with strong dorsal tufts, and shorter than the hindwings. Forewings narrow. Hindwings with veins 3 and 4 stalked. Legs naked. Larva with four pairs of abdominal prolegs.

Species

 Maliattha amorpha Butler, 1886
 Maliattha angustitaenia Warren, 1913
 Maliattha arefacta Butler, 1879
 Maliattha baetica Swinhoe, 1890
 Maliattha bella Staudinger, 1888
 Maliattha bicolor Viette, 1982
 Maliattha bilineata Hampson, 1898
 Maliattha blandula (Guenée, 1862)
 Maliattha chionozona Hampson, 1910
 Maliattha commersoni Viette, 1965
 Maliattha concinnimacula Guenée, 1852
 Maliattha curvilinea Warren, 1913
 Maliattha dubiefi Viette, 1982
 Maliattha erecta Moore, 1881
 Maliattha euryzona Hampson, 1910
 Maliattha ferrugina Turner, 1908
 Maliattha fervens Hampson, 1907
 Maliattha fuliginosa Warren, 1913
 Maliattha fuscimima Warren, 1913
 Maliattha guttifera Warren, 1913
 Maliattha inconcisa Butler, 1882
 Maliattha inconcisoides Holloway, 1979
 Maliattha khasanica Zolotarenko & Dubatolov, 1995
 Maliattha lacteata Warren, 1913
 Maliattha latifasciata Hampson, 1898
 Maliattha lativitta Moore, 1881
 Maliattha lemur Viette, 1965
 Maliattha mabnora Viette, 1982
 Maliattha marginalis Walker, [1863]
 Maliattha melaleuca Hampson, 1910
 Maliattha melanesiensis Robinson, 1975
 Maliattha ocellata Saalmüller, 1891
 Maliattha opposita Saalmüller, 1891
 Maliattha perrieri Viette, 1965
 Maliattha phaeozona Hampson, 1910
 Maliattha picata Butler, 1889
 Maliattha plumbata Butler, 1889
 Maliattha plumbitincta Hampson, 1902
 Maliattha pratti Viette, 1965
 Maliattha quadripartita Walker, 1865
 Maliattha rectilinea Viette, 1982
 Maliattha renalis Moore, 1882
 Maliattha ritsemae Snellen, 1880
 Maliattha rosacea Leech, 1889
 Maliattha ruptifascia Hampson, 1891
 Maliattha separata Walker, 1863
 Maliattha sexpartita Warren, 1913
 Maliattha signifera Walker, [1858]
 Maliattha sogai Viette, 1965
 Maliattha subcrocea Berio, 1960
 Maliattha subterminalis Warren, 1913
 Maliattha synochitis Grote & Robinson, 1868
 Maliattha tegulata Butler, 1889
 Maliattha toulgoeti Viette, 1965
 Maliattha tsaratanana Viette, 1965
 Maliattha umbrina Hampson, 1891
 Maliattha vialis Moore, 1882

References

Eustrotiinae